The Peter Anderson House is a historic house built in 1901, located at 300 South Howes Street in Fort Collins, Colorado.  It was listed on the National Register of Historic Places in 1979.

The house was designed by Montezuma Fuller and was built by Thomas Garnick. It has a sandstone and wood exterior and a hipped roof.

See also
National Register of Historic Places listings in Larimer County, Colorado

References

Buildings and structures in Fort Collins, Colorado
Houses completed in 1901
Houses on the National Register of Historic Places in Colorado
Houses in Larimer County, Colorado
National Register of Historic Places in Larimer County, Colorado